Black Alice, real name Lori Zechlin, is a DC Comics character introduced in Birds of Prey #76 (January 2005). She uses her magical powers to prey on drug dealers in her hometown of Dayton, Ohio.

Fictional character biography

Origin
Lori Zechlin is a teenager who lives with her father John and her mother. Neither Lori nor her father is aware that Mrs. Zechlin is addicted to prescription pharmaceuticals, which she purchases from local drug dealers. One day, overwhelmed by shame, Mrs. Zechlin commits suicide by overdosing and drowning herself in her pool. Lori discovers the body when she comes home from school. Lori also discovers, later that same night, that she has the mystical ability to "borrow" the magical powers of other superheroes or supervillains and also was absorbing all of dc magic unconsciously   . She does not have the same control over the powers as their owners and has little control over when she can take them or how long she can use them. Despite this, Lori (taking the name Black Alice) formulates a plan to avenge her mother's death and punish the prescription drug traffickers.

Lori's father, shattered and slipping into depression, becomes a recluse, although he tries to pretend for Lori's sake that nothing is wrong. Her mother's death also distresses Lori, but she is aware of the change in her father and assigns herself the role of caregiver. Her grades begin to slip, and she becomes alienated from her peers. Her primary social group, a Wiccan circle, expels her, claiming she is emitting "black energy" after her mother's death (in actuality, the circle's leader, Lori's best friend Dawn, is jealous of Lori's real and growing powers).

Having recently left Gotham City following the destruction of their clock tower headquarters, the superhero team the Birds of Prey are traveling the country by jet to identify and help previously unknown metahumans. Oracle becomes aware of Lori's power, but not her specific abilities. She sends Huntress, disguised as a school teacher, to keep an eye on Lori and offer counseling, while Black Canary is tasked with keeping surveillance on all of Lori's activities, to determine the specific nature and strength of her powers.

Lori abruptly leaves her boyfriend, Kyle, when she manifests Doctor Fate's powers, and seeks out a trio of suspected drug dealers. Before Lori can use lethal force, Black Canary intervenes. Doctor Fate's power fades, and Lori flees the scene, tailed by Black Canary. Suddenly manifesting Zatanna's powers, Lori binds and gags Canary and escapes.

Black Canary and Huntress unite to tail Kyle in the hopes of rediscovering Lori, and instead find that Kyle is two-timing Lori with Dawn. Lori discovers the same thing shortly afterwards and prepares to destroy a shopping mall (having now manifested the powers of Black Adam) in her efforts to avenge herself on Kyle. Black Canary is able to bring her down in an all-out brawl, but the Huntress brings a stop to Lori's rampage by presenting a contrite Dawn. Oracle turns Lori over to the care of the real Doctor Fate, where she can receive guidance in the use of her powers.

Day of Vengeance

Black Alice makes her second appearance in the Day of Vengeance miniseries. The Shadowpact asks for her aid in confronting the Spectre and Eclipso. Over her father's objections, she goes with the team. Despite her efforts, she does little more than delay the Spectre. Alice does manage to temporarily take the Spectre's powers. Since he is hostless, all this does is make the Spectre an intangible phantom, immune to harm. After witnessing both the death of the wizard Shazam and the destruction of the Rock of Eternity at the hands of the Spectre, she declines an offer to join the Shadowpact, choosing to return to her father and her hometown.

Later, in the Villains United: Infinite Crisis Special, she helps combat the global prison break that Alexander Luthor, Jr. orchestrates.

The Society
Lori is approached by Talia al Ghul, Felix Faust, and Cheetah. They attempt to get her to join the Society, offering both training and the resurrection of her mother. The Birds of Prey attempt to intervene. A frustrated and enraged Black Alice (who almost hangs Black Canary to death using Wonder Woman's golden lasso) teleports everyone to the outskirts of Dayton and states that she just wishes to be left alone. She returns home with her parents, her mother apparently fully resurrected, but living in a constant-shock state (she barely speaks, mechanically doing house chores).

Lori's life continues downhill, with her father turning alcoholic again due to his wife's condition, and popular boys and girls continuing to bully her at school. She summons the traveling helmet of Doctor Fate in an attempt to tame its powers. When the helmet starts to punish everyone who wrongs her, even her loved ones, Lori realizes that she does not need more power to attain happiness and sets the helmet free, spending more time to help rehabilitate her father. Her realization, however is short lived, as her difficult life finally takes a toll on her sanity. When Oracle summons her to help the Birds of Prey again, Black Alice apparently forgives the Birds and agrees. However, she soon snaps when Oracle reveals that her mood swings are a side effect of the antidepressants she has been taking to restrain herself, and that Lori has mirrored her mother's own addiction.

Her addiction to antidepressants saves her when she is kidnapped by Darkseid's henchmen and taken to the "Dark Side Club". Dosed with will-suppressing drugs and pitted against other teenaged metahumans, she discovers that her own drugs interfere with Darkseid's. Finding Misfit similarly trapped, but almost completely brainwashed and vulnerable, she briefly contemplates the idea of stealing her teleport abilities to flee alone. After discovering in Darkseid's files that she may be a blood relative of Misfit, she has a change of heart, and helps the girl escape. She leaves behind a letter, explaining her discoveries, but claiming that her feud with the young teleporter is not over.

A few weeks later, with a new scholastic year beginning, Lori brings her rivalry to a new level. Transferring to Platinum Heights High School, she learns that Misfit is also a student, forced to attend by Oracle. While Misfit has a difficult time adapting, Lori's "exotic" lifestyle, perceived as rebellious and independent, gains the instant acceptance and adoration of the school's Silicon Valley elite.

Various comics, including Birds of Prey and Day of Vengeance, say Black Alice is potentially the most powerful (and dangerous) teenager on the planet.

Reign in Hell
In the Reign In Hell storyline, Black Alice is referred to by Phantom Stranger as both "a novice" and "the Black Alice abomination". While in Hell, she seemingly teams up with Danny Khalifa, the latest incarnation of Ibis the Invincible, only to immediately betray him, apparently revealing herself to be loyal to Neron in the war for control of Hell. In actuality, she is there to find the one who stole a portion of her powers, retrieve the missing fragment, and bring vengeance down on whoever did it. She incurs the wrath of Lobo when she steals part of his strength to reach Hell's ruler. After Lori's unsuccessful attempt at stealing Satanus' power allows Blaze to gain sole control of Hell, she is returned to Earth, emotionally scarred by whatever she saw within the mind of Satanus.

Secret Six and Blackest Night
Black Alice resurfaces again by following Deadshot and Catman who had been hired to capture a child molester and bring him to the father of one of his victims. Alice confronts both Catman and Deadshot asking how much they pay. Following that she fights several policemen, as a trial of sorts, easily besting by stealing the powers of various magic users. She is accepted once she reveals that her dad is sick and that she needs money. Catman is troubled by the fact that Alice is not disturbed at the stuff they did and how easily she tends to violence.

On Alice's first official mission (taking place during the events of "Blackest Night"), the team is hired to free a drug kingpin from Belle Reve. Despite being enraged at the idea of helping a drug dealer, Alice participates in the attack on the prison, using the powers of Giganta to distract the guards while her teammates sneak in. It is revealed that the entire mission is a setup staged by the Suicide Squad to arrest the Six. Alice steals the powers of Suicide Squad member Nightshade and defeats both her and Count Vertigo. As Alice revels in her victory, a group of Black Lanterns attack her and the other Sixers. Her fear of them inhibits her control over her stolen powers until Bane's threat forces her to teleport the Six, Rick Flag, and Bronze Tiger to the House of Secrets.  Unfortunately, she brings the Black Lanterns with them and she refuses to return the power to Nightshade so she can teleport Amanda Waller to a place where she can find help. Waller knocks her out, and Nightshade takes her away only to return shortly with a Manhunter android containing the Green Lantern energy they need to destroy the Black Lanterns. Alice remains with the Six while the Squad leaves.

Some time later, Alice goes with Deadshot, Scandal, and Rag Doll to try to help Catman retrieve his kidnapped, and possibly murdered, infant son. However, all the four find are a trail of corpses Catman has left behind, the sight of which brings Alice to tears. Using Dr. Occult's abilities to locate and transport the four to South Africa, Alice suddenly reacts very hostilely towards Scandal. She mistakenly believes that Scandal is after Rag Doll, whom she calls her "boyfriend" (while Rag Doll does not exactly feel the same way, he does care for Alice), despite the fact that Scandal is a lesbian. Alice summons Etrigan's abilities, turning into Estrogan, and fights Scandal. She then turns back to normal and tearfully apologizes. Alice explains that she had attempted to cure her father's asthma using Raven's healing abilities, but unsure of how to properly use them, believes she gave him cancer by mistake.

In May 2010, Alice began co-starring in a back-up feature in Teen Titans alongside Zachary Zatara and Traci 13. Following this, Black Alice appears alongside fellow teen heroines Batgirl, Supergirl, Miss Martian, Lightning, Cyclone, Stargirl, Ravager, Misfit, and Terra as part of an all-female group of heroines gathered together to fight off Professor Ivo's army of robot sirens.

New 52
In the New 52 Alice's origin is changed. In Secret Six it is revealed that she lost her parents in a car crash that she believed she was the only survivor of. She actually died that day and her body is animated by the spirit of a dark elder pagan god.

Powers and abilities
Black Alice has the ability to temporarily usurp the magical powers of any being, even ones just as powerful, thus gaining all their capabilities and leaving them powerless in turn. The limit to the distance at which she can steal power of her target is unknown, but potentially limitless. When she steals someone's power, her clothing partially transforms to somewhat resemble that of a target being. She is also capable of stealing the abilities from multiple beings at once. 

She had taken these powers of the following:
Doctor Fate
Zatanna
A member of the Marvel Family
The Spectre
Wonder Girl or Wonder Woman
Felix Faust
John Constantine
Misfit
Raven
Giganta
Alan Scott
Etrigan the Demon
The Phantom Stranger
Blue Devil
Johnny Thunderbolt
Jeannette
Nightshade

In Secret Six, she threatened to use the Spectre's powers at the League of Shadows headquarters against Lady Shiva.

Other versions

DC Super Friends
In DC Super Friends #19 "Head of the Class", Black Alice is a member of a class of aspiring teenage supervillains taught by Headmaster Mind. Here, her power is to duplicate the magical powers of others instead of stealing them. In a battle with the Super Friends, she is able to duplicate Wonder Woman's powers and capture them with a copy of the Magic Lasso. After Mindgrabber Kid decides to do the right thing, Black Alice decides to do so as well, and the two help the Super Friends defeat and capture the other villains. As thanks, the Super Friends decide not to arrest the two. Black Alice says she'll go back to regular school and become a hero when she grows up.

References

External links
 Black Alice at Comic Vine

Characters created by Gail Simone
Comics characters introduced in 2005
DC Comics characters who use magic
DC Comics female superheroes
DC Comics metahumans
Fictional characters from Ohio
Fictional characters with absorption or parasitic abilities
Marvel Family